Factory Butte may refer to:

 Factory Butte (Emery County, Utah), United States
 Factory Butte (Wayne County, Utah), United States